Mohammad Alikhani is an Iranian reformist politician who currently serves as a member of the City Council of Tehran. Alikhani formerly represented Qazvin in the parliament.

He published a weekly named Taban and wrote a weblog.

References

Living people
Iranian newspaper publishers (people)
Iranian bloggers
Members of the 7th Islamic Consultative Assembly
Tehran Councillors 2017–
Year of birth missing (living people)